Broward Virtual School (BVS) offers full-time and part-time enrollment to students in grades K-12 through an online educational delivery system. Home educated students in grades 6-12 may enroll part-time as well. BVS offers students the opportunity to earn a standard high school diploma entirely online. BVS has been designated an "A" school by the Florida Department of Education .

Broward Virtual School is a franchise partner of Florida Virtual School for middle and high school curriculum. BVS is among the top performing Florida Virtual School franchise in Florida. BVS partners with K12 Inc. for its elementary school program. 
As a component of The School Board of Broward County, Broward Virtual School is fully accredited by the Southern Association of Colleges and Schools (SACS) and Commission on International and Trans-Regional Accreditation (CITA). The BVS administrative office is located in Coconut Creek, Florida inside Coconut Creek High School. BVS operates under the provisions of Florida Statutes 1002.37 and 1002.455.

Extracurricular activities for full-time students
            
             Broward Teen News Internships 
             National Honor Society
             National Junior Honor Society 
             Key Club
             Florida Future Educators of America
             Student talent show
             Field trips
             Academic competitions
             College planning seminars
             Junior and Senior prom

Notable alumni

 Jazz Jennings (Class of 2019, transgender rights advocate)
 Lexi Thompson (Class of 2012, Ladies Professional Golf Association Member)
 Naomi Osaka (Ladies professional tennis player)

Demographics
As of 2011, the total student enrollment was 459. The ethnic makeup of the school was 63% White, 9% Black, 20% Hispanic, 3% Asian or Pacific Islander, 3% Multiracial, and 1% Native American or Native Alaskan.

References

Broward County Public Schools
High schools in Fort Lauderdale, Florida
Public K-12 schools in Florida
2001 establishments in Florida
Educational institutions established in 2001